Ponos  or Ponus  (Ancient Greek: Πόνος Pónos) is the personification of hardship or toil.

Family

Hesiod
According to Hesiod's Theogony (226–232), "painful" Ponos was the child of Eris (Strife), with no father, and the brother of many other personifications:

Cicero
According to Cicero, Ponos's was called the son of the primordial gods, Nyx (Night) and Erebus (Darkness) and brother to other personifications:
Their [Aether and Hemera's] brothers and sisters, whom the ancient genealogists name Amor/ Eros (Love), Dolus (Guile), Metus/ Deimos (Fear), Labor/ Ponus (Toil), Invidentia/ Nemesis (Envy), Fatum/ Moros (Fate), Senectus/ Geras (Old Age), Mors/ Thanatos (Death), Tenebrae/ Keres (Darkness), Miseria/ Oizys (Misery), Querella/ Momus (Complaint), Gratia/ Philotes (Favour), Fraus/ Apate (Fraud), Pertinacia (Obstinacy), the Parcae/ Moirai (Fates), the Hesperides, the Somnia/ Oneiroi (Dreams): all of these are fabled to be the children of Erebus (Darkness) and Nox/ Nyx (Night).

Philosophy 
The Cynics promoted living a life of ponos. For the Cynics, this did not seem to mean actual physical work. Diogenes of Sinope, for example, lived by begging, not by doing manual labor. Rather, it means deliberately choosing a hard life — for instance, wearing only that thin cloak and going barefoot in winter.

Notes

References
 Caldwell, Richard, Hesiod's Theogony, Focus Publishing/R. Pullins Company (June 1, 1987). .
Marcus Tullius Cicero, Nature of the Gods from the Treatises of M.T. Cicero translated by Charles Duke Yonge (1812-1891), Bohn edition of 1878. Online version at the Topos Text Project.

Greek gods
Personifications in Greek mythology
Cynicism
Children of Nyx
Children of Eris (mythology)